USS Marguerite II (SP-892) was a United States Navy patrol vessel in commission from 1917 and 1919.

Marguerite II was built as a private motorboat in 1917. In 1917, the U.S. Navy acquired her for use as a section patrol boat during World War I. She was commissioned as USS Marguerite II (SP-892) sometime in 1917. Sometime in 1918 she was renamed USS SP-892, presumably to avoid confusion with another patrol boat. , in commission at the same time.

The Navy disposed of SP-892 sometime in 1919 via an unknown means.

No other records of Marguerite IIs operational history are available, nor are any records of her characteristics.

Notes

References
SP-892 Marguerite II at Department of the Navy Naval History and Heritage Command Online Library of Selected Images: U.S. Navy Ships -- Listed by Hull Number "SP" #s and "ID" #s -- World War I Era Patrol Vessels and other Acquired Ships and Craft numbered from SP-800 through SP-899
SP-892 Marguerite II at NavSource Online: Section Patrol Craft (SP) and Civilian Vessels (ID) Index

Patrol vessels of the United States Navy
World War I patrol vessels of the United States
1917 ships